Leave It Alone may refer to:

 "Leave It Alone" (Broken Bells song), 2014
 "Leave It Alone" (The Forester Sisters song), 1989
 "Leave It Alone" (Hayley Williams song), 2020
 "Leave It Alone" (Living Colour song), 1993
 "Leave It Alone" (Moist song), 1996
 "Leave It Alone" (Operator Please song), 2007
 "Leave It Alone", a song by Disturbed from Asylum, 2010
 "Leave It Alone", a song by NOFX from Punk in Drublic, 1994